London Tower is a  mountain summit located in the Alaska Range, in Denali National Park and Preserve, in Alaska, United States. Mount Bradley rises  directly across The Great Gorge to the west. Despite its relatively low elevation, it is notable for its west face with over 3,000 feet of vertical granite.

See also
Mountain peaks of Alaska

Gallery

References

External links

 NOAA weather: Talkeetna
 Localized weather: Mountain Forecast
 Flight through 747 Pass: YouTube (London Tower on right at 1:46 mark)

Alaska Range
Mountains of Matanuska-Susitna Borough, Alaska
Mountains of Denali National Park and Preserve
Mountains of Alaska
North American 2000 m summits